Agatharchides is a lunar impact crater located at the southern edge of Oceanus Procellarum, in the region between the Mare Humorum and Mare Nubium. To the east-southeast is the crater Bullialdus, and to the south-southwest lies Loewy. It is named after the Greek geographer Agatharchides.

The interior of the crater has been inundated by lava in the past, resurfacing the floor. The damaged outer wall varies considerably in height, ranging from level with the surface to rising as high as 1.5 km. The most intact portions of the wall are along the east and the west-southwest, while the rim is nearly non-existent to the north and heavily damaged to the south. A small craterlet lies along the western rim. The interior floor is marked only by a few tiny craterlets.

Satellite craters
By convention these features are identified on lunar maps by placing the letter on the side of the crater midpoint that is closest to Agatharchides.

References

External links 
 

Impact craters on the Moon